Einar Karlsson (1 September 1908 – 17 February 1980) was a Swedish wrestler. He competed at the 1932 and 1936 Summer Olympics and won two bronze medals: in the freestyle featherweight in 1932 and in the Greco-Roman featherweight in 1936. He also won seven national titles and three medals at the European Championships of 1933–1937, all in Greco-Roman events.

References

External links
 

1908 births
1980 deaths
Olympic wrestlers of Sweden
Wrestlers at the 1932 Summer Olympics
Wrestlers at the 1936 Summer Olympics
Swedish male sport wrestlers
Olympic bronze medalists for Sweden
Olympic medalists in wrestling
Medalists at the 1936 Summer Olympics
Medalists at the 1932 Summer Olympics
Sportspeople from Stockholm
20th-century Swedish people